The Two Moors Way is a long-distance trail mostly in Devon, UK, first established in 1976. It links Dartmoor and Exmoor and has been extended to become a Devon Coast-to-Coast trail.

History 

The Two Moors Way was the brainchild of Joe Turner of the Two Moors Way Association and was officially opened on 29 May 1976. The original Two Moors Way route spans 102 miles from Ivybridge on the southern boundary of Dartmoor National Park to Lynmouth on the North Devon Coast in Exmoor National Park. In 2005 the Two Moors Way was linked with the Erme–Plym Trail joining Wembury on the south Devon coast to Ivybridge to create a cross-county coast-to-coast route of just over 116 miles.

After Joe Turner's death in 2004, Dartmoor sculptor Peter Randall-Page created a testament to his work: two halves of an inscribed granite boulder now sit on the edge of Dartmoor and Exmoor, facing each other across 30 miles of rolling Mid Devon countryside.

In 2016, to mark the 40th anniversary of the original route, the Two Moors Way Association was reinvigorated to help promote the route, working in close partnership with the two National Parks and with Devon County Council who are responsible for maintaining and managing the path.

Route 

The route, which is waymarked in most places, passes through (from south to north): Wembury (optional) - Ivybridge - Holne - Hameldown - Chagford - Drewsteignton - Morchard Bishop - Witheridge - Knowstone - Hawkridge - Withypool - Simonsbath - Lynmouth. There are diversions and alternative routes for accessing accommodation, for avoiding the highest ground in bad weather, and because of concern over over-use: most of these were worked out originally in 1996 between the officers of the two  national park authorities, Steve Church (Countryside & Access Officer for Devon County Council) and John Macadam (author of the Aurum Press / Ordnance Survey Recreational Path Guide The Two Moors Way, published in 1997). The route does not go over the northern part of Dartmoor as this is the Dartmoor Training Area though many walkers competent at navigating with map and compass make their own route here when there is no live firing (which is publicised 6 weeks in advance, and occurs on about 120 days a year)<ref>{{Cite web |url=https://www.gov.uk/government/publications/dartmoor-firing-programme |title="Dartmoor firing times  |access-date=16 October 2022}}</ref> and rejoin the Two Moors Way in mid-Devon.

 Intersecting trails 
The Two Moors Way intersects several other walking trails running through the moorlands:
 Coincides with the Tarka Trail for part of the way through Exmoor
 Intersects with:
South West Coast Path
Macmillan Way West
Little Dart Ridge and Valley Walk
Taw-Teign Link
Dartmoor Way
Erme Valley Trail
Abbot's Way

 References 

Guidebooks:
 Arnold, Matthew, A trail guide to walking the Two Moors Way: from Lynmouth to Ivybridge (Trail Wanderer, 2018)
 Macadam, John, The Two Moors Way (Aurum Press, Ordnance Survey, 1997) - incorporating 1:25,000 OS maps and alternative routes.
 Viccars, Sue, Walking The Two Moors Way: Devon's Coast-to-Coast (Cicerone Press, 2019)
 Viccars, Sue, Walking The Two Moors Way: 1:25,000 route map booklet'' (Cicerone Press, 2019)

External links 

 The Two Moors Way Association website
 

Dartmoor
Exmoor
Long-distance footpaths in England
Footpaths in Devon
Footpaths in Somerset